The New Zealand quail (Coturnix novaezelandiae), or koreke in Māori, is an extinct quail species endemic to New Zealand. The male and female were similar, except the female was lighter. The first scientist to describe it was Sir Joseph Banks when he visited New Zealand on James Cook's first voyage. Terrestrial and temperate, this species inhabited lowland tussock grassland and open fernlands. The first specimen to be obtained by a European was collected in 1827 by Jean René Constant Quoy and Joseph Paul Gaimard on Dumont D'Urville's voyage.

History
Research was conducted between 2007 and 2009 into whether the quails on Tiritiri Matangi Island – which was spared the worst impact of introduced predators – might be a surviving population of this species, or  koreke-brown quail (Synoicus ypsilophora) hybrids. However, a genetic study showed instead that the quail on Tiritiri Matangi are Australian brown quail, Synoicus ypsilophora. Sequences were derived for all quail species within the Australian and New Zealand Coturnix sp. complex.

Taxonomy
It has sometimes been considered conspecific with the Australian stubble quail (Coturnix pectoralis), which would then be named Coturnix novaezelandiae pectoralis as the New Zealand bird was described first. However, the genetic analysis showed that they are separate though closely related species.

Gallery

References

External links
 Koreke, the New Zealand Quail (with pictures, article, taxonomy, & description).
 3D view of specimens RMNH 110.051 and RMNH 110.052 at Naturalis, Leiden (requires QuickTime browser plugin).
 New Zealand Quail / Koreke. Coturnix novaezelandiae. by Paul Martinson. Artwork produced for the book Extinct Birds of New Zealand, by Alan Tennyson, Te Papa Press, Wellington, 2006
The Quail (male and female) Coturnix Novae Zealandie by Johannes Keulemans in the collection of the Museum of New Zealand Te Papa Tongarewa
New Zealand Quail by George Lodge, 1913 in the collection of the Museum of New Zealand Te Papa Tongarewa

New Zealand quail
Extinct birds of New Zealand
Bird extinctions since 1500
Species made extinct by human activities
New Zealand quail
Species endangered by disease
Taxa named by Jean René Constant Quoy
Taxa named by Joseph Paul Gaimard